Myriapora is a genus of bryozoans belonging to the family Myriaporidae.

The genus has almost cosmopolitan distribution.

Species:

Myriapora beyrichi 
Myriapora bugei 
Myriapora fungiformis 
Myriapora kuhni 
Myriapora operculata 
Myriapora orientalis 
Myriapora sciutoi 
Myriapora simplex 
Myriapora truncata

References

Bryozoan genera